Into Thin Air: A Personal Account of the Mt. Everest Disaster is a 1997 bestselling nonfiction book written by Jon Krakauer. It details Krakauer's experience in the 1996 Mount Everest disaster, in which eight climbers were killed and several others were stranded by a storm. Krakauer's expedition was led by guide Rob Hall. Other groups were trying to summit on the same day, including one led by Scott Fischer, whose guiding agency, Mountain Madness, was perceived as a competitor to Hall's agency, Adventure Consultants.

Summary
Krakauer describes the events leading up to his eventual decision to participate in an Everest expedition in May 1996, despite having mostly given up mountain climbing years before. The 1996 expedition season recorded eight deaths, including that of Krakauer's guide Rob Hall. This was the third-highest recorded number of deaths on the mountain in a single day; the April 2015 Nepal earthquake caused the most at 21.

Krakauer, a journalist for the adventure magazine Outside, said initially his intention to climb Everest was purely professional. The original magazine story was to have Krakauer climb only to base camp, and report on the commercialization of the mountain. However, the idea of Everest reawakened his childhood desire to climb the mountain. Krakauer asked his editor to put off the story for a year so that he could train for a climb to the summit. From there, the book moves between events that take place on the mountain, and the unfolding tragedy, which occurs during the push to the summit. In the book, Krakauer alleges that essential safety methods adopted over the years by experienced guides on Everest are sometimes compromised by the competition between rival guiding agencies, in order to get their clients to the summit.

Controversy
Krakauer's recounting of certain aspects of the climb has generated criticism, both from some of the climb's participants and from fellow mountaineers such as Galen Rowell. Much of the disputed material centers on Krakauer's accounting of the actions of Russian climber and guide Anatoli Boukreev. An experienced high-altitude climber and guide for Scott Fischer, Boukreev descended the summit prior to his clients, ostensibly out of concern for their safety and in preparation for potential rescue efforts. Boukreev later mounted repeated solo rescue efforts, saving several lives. In his book, Krakauer acknowledged Boukreev's heroism in saving two climbers' lives, but questions his judgment, his decision to descend before clients, not using supplementary oxygen, his choices of gear on the mountain, and his interaction with clients. Boukreev provides a rebuttal to these allegations in his 1997 book The Climb.

Galen Rowell criticized Krakauer's account, citing numerous inconsistencies in his narrative while observing that Krakauer was sleeping in his tent while Boukreev was rescuing other climbers. Rowell argued that Boukreev's actions were nothing short of heroic, and his judgment prescient: "[Boukreev] foresaw problems with clients nearing camp, noted five other guides on the peak [Everest], and positioned himself to be rested and hydrated enough to respond to an emergency. His heroism was not a fluke."

The account has also been criticized for not informing the reader that the team members were receiving accurate daily weather forecasts and knew about the storm in advance.

In Krakauer's 1999 paperback edition of Into Thin Air, he addresses some of the criticism in a lengthy postscript.

Adaptation
Film rights for Into Thin Air were purchased by Sony almost immediately after the book's publication. The book was adapted into the TV movie Into Thin Air: Death on Everest (1997), starring Peter Horton as Scott Fischer and Christopher McDonald as Krakauer. The book and the film both contain the same strong editorial viewpoint regarding the fundamental causes of the tragedy, although the film differs sharply from the book in details regarding responsibility.

The 2015 film Everest, by director Baltasar Kormákur, depicts the same events as the book, with actor Michael Kelly portraying Krakauer. According to Kormákur, it is not based on Krakauer's book.

See also 

List of people who died climbing Mount Everest
After the Wind, a 2014 book by Lou Kasischke
The Climb, a 1997 book by Anatoli Boukreev

References

Further reading 
 
 This account critically analyzes the Adventure Consultants team and provides an alternative explanation for the events of those few days on Everest. Krakauer has rebutted the claims of this book in a postscript to the 1999 printing of Into Thin Air.
 
 This book puts forward evidence that detailed weather forecasts were being received by several groups well in advance of their teams' summit attempts. These forecasts highlighted clearly the oncoming strong storm that struck the mountain on 10th/11th May causing the tragedy. While most of Ratcliffe's comments are directed towards the two expedition leaders for ignoring the forecasts and continuing on the summit attempts, thereby exposing clients to such high risk, he also makes clear that in his view, Krakauer and many others' description of the storm as "sudden and unexpected" is wholly inaccurate. Furthermore, Ratcliffe suggests that Krakauer, by not mentioning the forecasts, did not produce an accurate or adequately researched account.

The first-hand experience of Lene Gammelgard, of Fischer's expedition.

 Mike Trueman, a member of the 1996 International Polish South Pillar Team, was at Camp 2 as the 1996 Everest tragedy unfolded. He was asked to descend to Base Camp where he coordinated the rescue effort. His book published in May 2015 complements the story related in Into Thin Air.
 
A first-hand account of Hall's expedition.

A first-hand account of the storm's impact on climbers on the mountain's other side, the North Ridge, where several climbers also died..
 
The first-hand account of Lou Kasischke, of Rob Hall's expedition. Kasischke details the events surrounding the summit attempt as well as the decision that saved his life.

External links
 Into Thin Air -- the original article by Jon Krakauer published in Outside magazine in September 1996 (saved by Archive.org)
 Interview with Peter Horton on the TV Movie
 
 NPR interview with Jon Krakauer, May 1996

Mountaineering books
Mount Everest in fiction
1997 non-fiction books
Villard (imprint) books
Books about survival skills
Non-fiction books adapted into films